Flying Colours is the ninth studio album by British-Irish singer Chris de Burgh, released in 1988 by A&M Records.

The biggest single released from the album, "Missing You", peaked at No. 3 on the UK Singles Chart, and No. 1 in Ireland in December 1988. The album went straight to number one in the UK on 15 October 1988 and is the only de Burgh album to reach number one on the UK Albums Chart.

Track listing
All tracks composed by Chris de Burgh.

The track "The Simple Truth (A Child Is Born)" was a bonus track on the CD release, and was not included on the original vinyl or cassette versions of the album.

Personnel 

 Chris de Burgh – vocals, guitars
 Phil Palmer – guitars
 Adrian Lee – keyboards
 Andy Richards – keyboards, synthesizers 
 Peter Van Hooke – drums, percussion 
 Chris White – saxophones

Production 
 Produced by Chris de Burgh (tracks 1–6, 8–14) and Paul Hardiman (tracks 1–7, 9–14).
 Engineered and mixed by Paul Hardiman
 Recorded at Powerplay Studios (Zürich, Switzerland).
 Mastered by Arnie Acosta at A&M Mastering Studios (Los Angeles, CA).
 Photography – Paul Cox
 Art direction and design – Michael Ross
 Illustration – Romas Foord
 Management – Dave Margereson and Kenny Thomson for Mismanagement, Inc.

Charts

Weekly charts

Year-end charts

Certifications

References

External links

1988 albums
Albums produced by Paul Hardiman
A&M Records albums
Chris de Burgh albums